Patrick Lynch may refer to:
Patrick Neeson Lynch (1817–1882), Catholic bishop during the American Civil War
Patrick Lynch (Roman Catholic bishop) (born 1947), Irish Roman Catholic bishop
Patrick Lynch (Rhode Island attorney general) (born 1965), former Attorney General of Rhode Island
Patrick Lynch (Irish attorney general) (1866–1947), Irish politician
Patrick J. Lynch (biomedical illustrator) (born 1953), American author and artist
Patrick Lynch (Argentina) (1715–1789), Irish ancestor of Che Guevara, born in Galway, emigrated to Argentina
Patrick Lynch (Australian politician) (1867–1944), Senator
Patrick Lynch (economist) (1917–2001), professor of economics at University College Dublin and chairman of Aer Lingus
Patrick Lynch (Galway) (fl. 1659–1673), healed by a miracle
P. J. Lynch (Patrick James Lynch, born 1962), Irish artist and children's book illustrator
Patrick Lynch, a pseudonym for the authors Philip Sington and Gary Humphreys
Patrick Lynch (police officer) (born 1964), head of the Patrolmen's Benevolent Association of the City of New York
Patrick Lynch (educationalist), New Zealand educationalist
Patrick Lynch, co-founder of Law School Transparency

See also
John M. Lynch (John M. "Pat" Lynch), Mayor of Somerville, Massachusetts and Chair of the Massachusetts Democratic Party